Daniele Gaither is an American actress and comedian. Gaither is most notable for her membership in the recurring cast of comedians on sketch comedy series MADtv.

Early life
 
Daniele Gaither was born in St. Paul, Minnesota. As a child, Gaither was the class clown with a knack for storytelling and mimicry. Like her fellow MADtv castmates Nicole Sullivan and Josh Meyers, she attended Northwestern University at Evanston, Illinois. In 1993, she moved to Los Angeles to pursue an acting career, and attend the Groundlings School, where aspiring sketch and improv performers are given a systematic approach to learning improvisation and writing skills.

While she studied at the Groundlings school, Gaither was trained by Michael McDonald, before his tenure on MADtv. She completed the school and became a member of The Groundlings on Melrose Avenue in Hollywood. She left the group in 2006.

In her comedy, Gaither tries to "represent people that you see in the streets and know in everyday life," and sometimes uses her family experiences as material. She does impressions of people that she grew up admiring, such as Patti LaBelle, Marla Gibbs and Isabel Sanford, but also does impressions of current celebrities like Oprah Winfrey, Star Jones and Lil' Kim.

Gaither's first regular television appearance was on Hype in 2000. After her first big break, she appeared on NBC's The Rerun Show. Gaither has a recurring role as Chandra the hairdresser on Comedy Central's Reno 911!.

MADtv
Gaither first appeared in an episode of MADtv'''s second season, which featured rap star Ice-T. The skit was concerned a mock debate between U.S. President Bill Clinton (played by Bryan Callen) and U.S. Senator Bob Dole (played by David Herman) who transformed himself into a "twisted" version of the 1970s blaxploitation icon Dolemite. Gaither played one of Dole's "Dolemite girls."

Gaither officially joined the cast of MADtv in 2003, seven years after her initial appearance on the series, as a featured performer for the ninth season. She became the second African American female cast member in the show's history, when she replaced Debra Wilson. Gaither was later promoted to a repertory performer status the following season. Some of her characters were only seen one time on the discussion show Real Mother****ing Talk. Outside of that, some of her best characters included senior citizen Dilly Mae Jackson, Taco Hell boss Loretta, and Yvoone Criddle, a middle aged woman who openly acknowledges her own sociopathic behavior yet simultaneously appears to be oblivious to its perversity.

Gaither portrayed offbeat impersonations of celebrities, which included Condoleezza Rice, Eve, La La Vasquez, and Tyra Banks.

Gaither was released from MADtv by FOX in June 2006.

Characters
 Dellie Mae Jackson (7 A.M. Condo Report)
 Loretta (Taco Hell)
 Mrs. Conkling (Holly Meadow Estates)
 Renee (QVC Quacker Factory)
 Shatrice (The B.S.)
 Yvonne Criddle

Impressions

 Aisha Tyler
 Alicia Keys
 Bonnie Franklin (as Ann Romano from One Day at a Time)
 Beyoncé Knowles
 Brittany Murphy 
 Chandra Wilson
 Condoleezza Rice
 Eve
 Fantasia
 Helen Martin (as Pearl Shay from 227)
 Isabel Sanford (as Louise Jefferson from The Jeffersons)
 Jackée Harry
 Jada Pinkett Smith
 Janet Jackson (as Charlene from Diff'rent Strokes)
 Jully Black
 Lark Voorhees (as Lisa Turtle from Saved by the Bell)
 Kim Fields (as Tootie Ramsey in The Facts of Life) 
 La La Vasquez
 LaWanda Page (as Aunt Esther from Sanford & Son)

 Lil' Kim
 Marla Gibbs (as Florence Johnston from The Jeffersons)
 Mary J. Blige
 Mo'Nique
 Mýa
 Omarosa Manigault
 Oprah Winfrey
 Patti LaBelle
 Raven-Symoné
 Regina Taylor
 Star Jones
 Tyra Banks
 Vanessa Minnillo
 Wanda Sykes

PETA involvement
Gaither is a lifelong vegetarian and animal lover, and was one of the 180 celebrities nominated for PETA’s 2004 "World’s Sexiest Vegetarians", which Alicia Silverstone won. She also co-hosted the "2003 Rotten Jellyfish awards" with fellow Groundling Jennifer Coolidge.

Trivia
Gaither appeared on Hype with fellow MADtv cast member Frank Caliendo and The Rerun Show with Paul Vogt.

Catch Phrases
"I’m in Jimmy Choo Boots M***** F*****!" - Eve (Hollywood Squares)
"I got Herpes.... The End" - Loretta (Taco Hell)
"Yes I did" - Yvonne Criddle (Stolen Parking Spot)
"Oh well, don't worry baby, you can be just like Angelina Jolie and adopt a couple little yellow babies"- Beyoncé Knowles (MadTV)
"Nobody asked you to talk! You better get to work! Do a better job cleanin' then you did wit' singin'! That ol' jive duet with Nelly, ain't nobody wanna hear that, nobody buyin' yo' album!"- Beyoncé Knowles (MadTV)
"President Kickbutt out"- Super President Kickbutt (The Thundermans)
”They want Sextina Aquafina baby!” - Sextina Aquafina (Bojack Horseman)

Television appearancesReno 911! (2003, 2005) as ChandraA Mine Is A Terrible Thing To Waste (2017) as ViennettaThe Rerun Show (2002) as Series RegularHype (2000) as Various CharactersMADtv (1996, 2003–06) as Various CharactersTyler Perry's House of Payne (2007) as SmokeyThe Thundermans (2014–2018) as Super President KickbuttThe Haunted Hathaways (2014) as Super President Kickbutt - Crossover: "The Haunted Thundermans"BoJack Horseman (2016-2020) as Sextina Aquafina and Biscuits BraxbyThe Great North (2021-2022) as Various Characters

Filmography
 No Ordinary Hero: The SuperDeafy Movie (2013)
 Necessary Evil (2008)
 Lincoln's Eyes (2005)
 Caught'' (2002)

References

External links

Living people
African-American actresses
African-American female comedians
American television actresses
American film actresses
American impressionists (entertainers)
Actresses from Saint Paul, Minnesota
American women comedians
American sketch comedians
21st-century American comedians
21st-century American actresses
21st-century African-American women
21st-century African-American people
20th-century African-American people
20th-century African-American women
Year of birth missing (living people)